Be1 NFA is a football team, which based in Kaunas, Lithuania.

History
The National Football Academy was established in 2006.

In 2012 it was founded for the team, I Lyga. In that season they were in 6th places. After the season heads of NFA decided play in 3rd tier.

In 2013 the club competed in II Lyga (3rd tier). After the first half of the season the club was in 3rd position. FK NFA withdrew mid season, their license was taken over by FC Stumbras, who went on to win the first place. The head coach of FC Stumbras was son of the president of LFF (Lithuanian Football Federation).

In 2017 FK NFA was re-established again. It played in II Lyga, won the top spot and gained promotion to I Lyga.

The season of 2018 was in I Lyga, the second tier of Lithuanian football. NFA means National Football Academy, and this team represented this organisation. The club participated in competitions without licensing needing for other football clubs.

In 2018 I Lyga the club reached the 10th position. After the season the NFA was going to be restructured, and the team became defunct.

Since 2019 Be1 NFA 
In 2019, the management of the academy was taken from LFF (Lithuanian Football Federation) over by the Kauno Futbolo Akademija  (Be1SC) and NFA renamed to Be1 NFA.

In 2021 a team was formed and played in the Antra lyga (Second League).

15 June 2022 in the LFF Cup tournament they lost match against FC Džiugas Telšiai and were knocked down with the result 0:6.

In 2021 was second in Antra lyga (Secand League) and have the right to participate in the Pirma lyga (First League).

Recent seasons

Stadium

Be1 NFA Stadium is a home ground of Be1 NFA located in Kaunas, Lithuania. The stadium used mostly for football matches and is the home stadium of FK Kauno Žalgiris, FC Stumbras and other team in early spring, later autumn and winter seasons. And for be1 NFA this stadium is for all home matches.

Kit

Kit changes of FK NFA
NFA colors was white shirts, black shorts, and white socks. Away kits are red shirts, green shorts, and green socks.

Kit manufacturer; Hummel (2017–2018)

Kit changes of Be1 NFA
Be1 NFA colors currently is white shirts, dark blue shorts, and white socks. Away kits are dark blue shirts, dark blue shorts, and dark blue socks.

Kit manufacturer; Nike (2021–)

Current squad
Updated 2 August 2018

|-----
! colspan="9" bgcolor="#B0D3FB" align="left" |
|----- bgcolor="#DFEDFD"

|-----
! colspan="9" bgcolor="#B0D3FB" align="left" |
|----- bgcolor="#DFEDFD"

|-----
! colspan="9" bgcolor="#B0D3FB" align="left" |
|----- bgcolor="#DFEDFD"

References

External links
 Official site of Academy
 Facebook of Be1 NFA
 Lietuvosfutbolas.lt about FK NFA

Football clubs in Lithuania
Football clubs in Kaunas
2006 establishments in Lithuania
Association football clubs established in 2006